The slate-throated gnatcatcher (Polioptila schistaceigula) is a species of bird in the family Polioptilidae. It is found in Colombia, Ecuador, and Panama.

Taxonomy and systematics

The slate-throated gnatcatcher is monotypic. It is apparently sister the Guianan gnatcatcher (Polioptila guaianensis) group and at one time it was suggested that they were conspecific.

Description

Its crown, the sides of the head, and the upperparts are slate gray, darker on the back. Its cheeks are whitish, its throat and breast sooty, and its belly and flanks white. Its tail is mostly black with some white on the outermost feathers. The sexes are alike.

Distribution and habitat

The slate-throated gnatcatcher is found from central and eastern Panama south through western Colombia into northwestern Ecuador. It inhabits humid primary forest, mature secondary forest, and their borders.

Behavior

Feeding

The slate-throated gnatcatcher's diet is poorly known, but it is probably small arthropods like those of other Polioptila gnatcatchers. To feed it actively moves through the canopy and sub-canopy, and lower at the forest edges. It follows mixed-species foraging flocks singly or in pairs.

Breeding

No information has been published about the slate-throated gnatcatcher's breeding phenology.

Vocalization

The slate-throated gnatcatcher's most frequent vocalization is "a short, rather faint, ascending trill, 'trrrrrrt'" . It also has a nasal mewing call .

References

slate-throated gnatcatcher
Birds of Colombia
Birds of the Tumbes-Chocó-Magdalena
slate-throated gnatcatcher
Taxonomy articles created by Polbot